Hayaviyeh (also Romanized as Ḩayāvīyeh and Ḩayāvīyyeh) is a village in Mosharrahat Rural District, in the Central District of Ahvaz County, Khuzestan Province, Iran. At the 2006 census, its population was 183, in 41 families.

References 

Populated places in Ahvaz County